PoliWood is a 2009 American documentary film directed by Barry Levinson and produced by Tim Daly, Robin Bronk and Robert E. Baruc.

Synopsis
The Democratic and Republican National Conventions held in 2008 during the United States presidential election that year are examined in depth in PoliWood, which features interviews with well-known Hollywood celebrities like Susan Sarandon and Anne Hathaway.

Interviewees

 Richard Abramowitz
 Stephen Baldwin
 Annette Bening
 Ellen Burstyn
 Rachael Leigh Cook
 Bradley Cooper
 David Crosby
 Alan Cumming
 Tim Daly
 Charlie Daniels
 Robert Davi
 Dana Delany
 Giancarlo Esposito
 Tom Fontana
 Danny Glover
 Anne Hathaway
 Spike Lee
 Blanche Lincoln
 Josh Lucas
 Frank Luntz
 Matthew Modine
 Tom Morello
 Lawrence O'Donnell
 David Paterson
 Gloria Reuben
 Susan Sarandon
 Richard Schiff
 Ron Silver
 Arlen Specter
 Sting
 Lynn Whitfield
 will.i.am
 Zooey Deschanel

Debuts and receptions
PoliWood had its premiere at Tribeca Film  y 1, 2009 and continued screening through various film festivals including the 2009 Maryland film festival, Austin Film Festival, Denver Starz Film Festival and the 2010 Sedona Film Festival and Artivist Film Festival. It also got a special screening at Paley Center for Media in New York on October 29, 2009. The event was attended by Poliwood director and producers. It had its TV premiere November 2, 2009 on Showtime.

References

External links

American documentary films
2000s English-language films
Documentary films about American politics
Films directed by Barry Levinson
2009 films
2009 documentary films
2000s American films